Willie Osley (born April 10, 1951) is a former American football defensive back. He played for the New England Patriots and Kansas City Chiefs in 1974.

References

1951 births
Living people
American football defensive backs
Illinois Fighting Illini football players
New England Patriots players
Kansas City Chiefs players
Players of American football from Detroit
Denby High School alumni